Hayasakaia is a genus of cnidarians belonging to the family Tetraporellidae.

The species of this genus are found in Southeastern Asia.

Species:
 Hayasakaia cystosa Linnaeus, 1958 
 Hayasakaia fasciacerioformis Yang, 1978

References

Anthozoa
Anthozoa genera